The 1998–99 season saw Southend United compete in the Football League Third Division where they finished in 18th position with 54 points.

Final league table

Results
Southend United's score comes first

Legend

Football League Third Division

FA Cup

League Cup

Football League Trophy

Squad statistics

References
General
Southend United 1998–99 at soccerbase.com (use drop down list to select relevant season)

Specific

Southend United F.C. seasons
Southend United